Marlon N. Humphrey (born July 8, 1996) is an American football cornerback for the Baltimore Ravens of the National Football League (NFL). He attended Hoover High School, where he was named to the USA Today All-USA high school football team in 2012 and 2013. During his tenure, he won a silver medal in the 110 metres hurdles at the 2013 World Youth Championships in Donetsk, Ukraine. He also was named as a USA Today All-American Track and Field Team.

Humphrey played college football at Alabama in 2015 and 2016. During his stint, he intended to compete in track and football, but went on to focus just on football. In 2015, he and the Alabama football team won the CFP National Championship. In 2016, he was named to the College Football All-America Team.

Humphrey was drafted 16th overall by the Ravens in the 2017 NFL Draft. In 2019, he changed his jersey number from 29 to 44 after the team signed Earl Thomas. He earned a first-team All-Pro honor in 2019 and was named to the Pro Bowl team in 2019, 2020 and 2022.

High school career
A native of Hoover, Alabama, Humphrey attended Hoover High School, where he was a three-time All-State selection. During his junior and senior seasons, Hoover went a combined 30–1, winning AHSAA 6A State Championships in 2013. Humphrey was named as a USA Today High School All-American for the 2012 and 2013 seasons. Humphrey was a highly-touted five-star prospect in the class of 2014 and received nine offers from Power Five schools, including Alabama, Florida State, UCLA, Auburn, Clemson, Georgia, Michigan State, North Carolina, South Carolina, and Tennessee. Humphrey was vocal about his preference for attending Alabama and officially visited only Mississippi, Florida State, and Alabama, officially committing to the latter on January 29, 2014.

He was rated as high as the ninth-best recruit in the country, and three major recruiting websites all listed him as a top five player at his position. Rivals.com ranked Humphrey the highest positionally, behind only Jabrill Peppers. 247Sports.com ranked him third behind Tony Brown and Adoree' Jackson, and ESPN.com ranked him fifth behind Peppers, Brown, Jackson, and Teez Tabor. Rivals and 247Sports listed Humphrey as the best recruit from the state of Alabama in his class, while ESPN ranked him second behind Bo Scarbrough.

In high school, Humphrey also competed at a world-class level in track. He won a silver medal in the 110 metres hurdles at the 2013 World Youth Championships in Donetsk, Ukraine. He lost to Jaheel Hyde of Jamaica, who established a new championship record and came .01 seconds shy of tying the World Youth Best held by Wilhem Belocian. Humphrey was also named to the USA Today All-American Track and Field Team.

College career
Humphrey intended to compete in football and track for the Crimson Tide. After redshirting his initial year in Tuscaloosa, he became a starter at cornerback in 2015.

2015 (Redshirt freshman) 
The Crimson Tide's second-string cornerback had an electrifying first year at Alabama. He earned the starting job in his first game against Wisconsin and ranked second on the team in interceptions with 3 during the 2015 season. Humphrey was an essential part of an elite 2015 Alabama defense earning Freshman All-American rights. The team went on to win their 16th national championship, with Humphrey recovering a key onside kick midway through the fourth quarter of the game.

2016 
After his impressive first season, Humphrey ended up earning first-team All-American rights in his final stint with the team. He started 2016 with the team's first interception for a touchdown against USC, and started 14 games. Humphrey continued to dominate opposing receivers the rest of the season, and declared his early departure from the collegiate level for the NFL draft.

College statistics

Professional career
Humphrey received an invitation to the NFL Combine and completed nearly all of the required drills, except for the shuttle and vertical. He participated at Alabama's Pro Day and decided to only do positional drills for the scouts and team representatives. He attended pre-draft visits with multiple teams, including the Philadelphia Eagles, Buffalo Bills, Dallas Cowboys, and Pittsburgh Steelers.

At the conclusion of the pre-draft process, Humphrey was projected to be a first round pick by NFL draft experts and scouts. He was ranked as the second best cornerback prospect in the draft by ESPN analyst Mel Kiper Jr., was ranked the third best cornerback in the draft by NFL analysts Bucky Brooks and Mike Mayock, was ranked the fourth best cornerback by ESPN, and was ranked the fifth best cornerback in the draft by Sports Illustrated and DraftScout.com.

2017
The Baltimore Ravens selected Humphrey in the first round (16th overall) of the 2017 NFL Draft. Humphrey was the second cornerback drafted in 2017, after Ohio State cornerback Marshon Lattimore (11th overall). 

On May 5, 2017, the Baltimore Ravens signed Humphrey to a  fully guaranteed four-year, $11.84 million contract with a signing bonus of $6.75  million.

Humphrey competed against Brandon Carr to be a starting cornerback during training camp. Head coach John Harbaugh named Humphrey the third cornerback on the depth chart to begin the regular season, behind Jimmy Smith and Brandon Carr.

He made his professional regular season debut in the Baltimore Ravens' season-opening 20–0 victory at the Cincinnati Bengals. On October 8, 2017, Humphrey earned his first career start and recorded three combined tackles during a 30–17 win at the Oakland Raiders in Week 5. On November 19, 2017, Humphrey recorded three combined tackles, deflected two passes, and made his first career interception in the Ravens' 23–0 victory at the Green Bay Packers in Week 11. Humphrey made his first career interception off a pass attempt by quarterback Brett Hundley, which was originally intended for wide receiver Jordy Nelson, and returned it for a 15-yard gain in the fourth quarter. In Week 13, he collected a season-high seven combined tackles, broke up a pass, and made an interception during a 44–20 win against the Detroit Lions. Humphrey became a starting cornerback for the last four regular season games after Jimmy Smith was placed on injured reserve after tearing his Achilles tendon. He finished his rookie season in 2017 with 34 combined tackles (30 solo), 11 pass deflections, and two interceptions in 16 games and five starts. He received an overall grade of 70.7 from Pro Football Focus in 2017.

2018
Head coach John Harbaugh named Humphrey a starting cornerback to begin the regular season after Jimmy Smith was suspended for the first four games for violating the league's personal conduct policy. He started in the Baltimore Ravens' season-opener against the Buffalo Bills and made two solo tackles and a season-high three pass deflections during a 47–3 victory. He finished the season playing in 14 games with eight starts, recording 37 combined tackles, a forced fumble, and a team-leading 15 pass deflections and two interceptions. He was given a grade of 80.0 by Pro Football Focus, which ranked 11th among all cornerbacks.

2019

In 2019, Humphrey changed his jersey number from 29 to 44 to accommodate the signing of Earl Thomas for the 2019 season.  In week 1 against the Miami Dolphins, Humphrey intercepted Josh Rosen once as the Ravens won 59–10.
In week 4 blowout 25–40 loss to the Cleveland Browns, after getting into an altercation with Odell Beckham Jr., Humphrey pinned him to the turf. Initially, it appeared that Humphrey choked Beckham Jr., but the Ravens released a close-up video after the game that showed Humphrey had two fists full of jersey and did not touch Beckham Jr.'s neck. After the game, Humphrey apologized to Beckham and said that his response to Beckham was not a brand of football he wanted to represent.
In week 5 against the Pittsburgh Steelers, Humphrey forced wide receiver JuJu Smith-Schuster to fumble the ball and recovered the ball.  Humphrey's forced fumble set up a game-winning field goal by Justin Tucker in the 26–23 win.
In week 6 against the Cincinnati Bengals, Humphrey recorded an interception off Andy Dalton in the 23–17 win.
In week 7 against the Seattle Seahawks, Humphrey recovered a fumble for an 18-yard touchdown on a ball lost by rookie wide receiver DK Metcalf in the 30–16 win. 
In week 9 against the New England Patriots, Humphrey recovered a fumble forced by teammate Patrick Onwuasor on wide receiver Julian Edelman for a 70-yard touchdown in the 37–20 win. This was Humphrey's second touchdown in two games. The 70-yard fumble recovery touchdown set the record for longest in Baltimore Ravens team history.
In week 16 against the Cleveland Browns, Humphrey intercepted a pass thrown by Baker Mayfield late in the fourth quarter which sealed a 31–15 Ravens' win. At the end of the regular season, Humphrey had been named to the Pro Bowl and the AP 2019 All-Pro Team.

2020

On April 28, 2020, the Ravens exercised the fifth-year option on Humphrey's rookie contract. In Week 1 against the Cleveland Browns, Humphrey recorded his first interception of the season off a pass thrown by Baker Mayfield during the 38–6 win. On October 1, Humphrey signed a five-year, $97.5 million contract extension with $66 million guaranteed. In Week 5 against the Cincinnati Bengals, Humphrey recorded his first career full sack on Joe Burrow during the 27–3 win.  He also forced a fumble on wide receiver Mike Thomas which was returned for a 53 yard touchdown by teammate Patrick Queen. Humphrey was placed on the reserve/COVID-19 list by the team on November 2, 2020, and was activated on November 11, 2020.

2021
On December 5, 2021, Humphrey suffered a season-ending torn pectoral muscle injury in a Week 13 loss to the Pittsburgh Steelers. He was placed on injured reserve on December 7, 2021, becoming one of the 19 players that the Ravens would place on the list that season. He finished the year with 58 combined tackles, a quarterback hit, an interception, a forced fumble, and 13 pass deflections.

2022
Humphrey returned to his starting role at the beginning of the 2022 season. In a 24–9 Week 1 win over the New York Jets, he had seven tackles, a quarterback hit, and recovered a fumble. He had his first interception of the year in a Week 3 37–26 win over the New England Patroits. The next week, Humphrey returned an interception 26 yards in a 20–23 loss to the Buffalo Bills.

NFL career statistics

Regular season

References

External links

Alabama Crimson Tide bio
Baltimore Ravens bio

1996 births
Living people
People from Hoover, Alabama
Track and field athletes from Alabama
African-American players of American football
Players of American football from Alabama
American football defensive backs
Alabama Crimson Tide football players
Under Armour All-American football players
Baltimore Ravens players
21st-century African-American sportspeople
American Conference Pro Bowl players